Dewaldt Otto Duvenage (born 22 May 1988) is a South African rugby union footballer.

He signed a deal to join French Top 14 side Perpignan in 2013.

He joined  prior to the 2017–18 Pro14 season.

In 2008 he played for South Africa U20 and in 2017 for South Africa 'A'.

References

External links
Stormers profile
WP rugby profile

itsrugby.co.uk profile

1988 births
Living people
Afrikaner people
Alumni of Paarl Gimnasium
Benetton Rugby players
Boland Cavaliers players
Rugby union players from Bellville, South Africa
Rugby union scrum-halves
South Africa Under-20 international rugby union players
South African rugby union players
Stormers players
USA Perpignan players
Western Province (rugby union) players